Gundlach is a German surname, it may refer to:

 Ernst Gundlach (1834–1908), German-American inventor of optical instruments
 Franz Christian Gundlach, called F. C. Gundlach (1926–2021), German photographer, collector and curator
 Guy David Gundlach (1955–2011), American entrepreneur, business leader and film producer
 Herman Gundlach (1913–2005), American footballer
 Jacob Gundlach, in 1858 founder of the "Gundlach Bundschu Winery" in California
 Jeffrey Gundlach (born 1959), investment banker, founder of Doubleline Capital
 Jens Gundlach (born 1961), German experimental physicist
 Juan Gundlach (1810–1896), German-Cuban naturalist and taxonomist
any of the several taxa named after Juan Gundlach, such as:
Gundlach's hawk (Accipiter gundlachii)
Gundlach's Caribbean toad - Bufo gundlachii
 Rudolf Gundlach (1892–1957), Polish engineer, inventor of the tank periscope
 Robert Gundlach (1926–2010), American physicist and inventor
 Willi Gundlach (born 1929), German choral conductor and musicologist

See also
Gundelach